Oregon Mill Complex, also known as Oregon Pike Mill & House; Oregon Mill-Twin Springs Farm, is a historic grist mill complex located in Oregon, Manheim Township, Lancaster County, Pennsylvania along Lititz Run. The mill was built in 1814, and is a two- to three-story, limestone structure.  It is five bay by three bay, and has a gable roof.  The mill was rebuilt in 1909.  The former miller's house is a 2 1/2-story, stucco coated stone building with a hipped roof and in a conservative Italianate style. The limestone end barn was built between 1798 and 1815, and features a high-pitched gable roof.

It was listed on the National Register of Historic Places in 1985.

References

Grinding mills on the National Register of Historic Places in Pennsylvania
Italianate architecture in Pennsylvania
Industrial buildings completed in 1814
Buildings and structures in Lancaster County, Pennsylvania
Grinding mills in Pennsylvania
National Register of Historic Places in Lancaster County, Pennsylvania